Club Deportivo Bala Azul is a football team based in Mazarrón in the autonomous community of Region of Murcia. Founded in 1948, the team plays in Tercera División - Group 13. Their stadium is the Estadio Playa Sol, which has a capacity of 4,500.

In 1996, the club merged with Mazarrón CF, becoming Playas de Mazarrón CF. However, in the following year, the fusion was undone mainly due to the high rivalry between both sides.

Season to season

15 seasons in Tercera División

External links
Futbolme team profile 

Football clubs in the Region of Murcia
Association football clubs established in 1948
1948 establishments in Spain